Charlton Bullseye may refer to:

Charlton Bullseye (comic), a comic produced by Charlton Comics
Charlton Bullseye (fanzine), a fanzine by the CPL Gang